The Crow River is a river located in Kahurangi National Park in the West Coast Region of New Zealand. It arises in the Wharepapa / Arthur Range and flows south-west and then north-west into the Karamea River. The river may be named after the South Island kōkako, sometimes called the orange-wattled crow.

Brown trout can be fished in the river.

A backcountry hut is available for trampers near the junction with the Karamea River.

See also
List of rivers of New Zealand

References

Buller District
Rivers of the West Coast, New Zealand
Kahurangi National Park
Rivers of New Zealand